ROKS Iri (PCC-768) was a  of the Republic of Korea Navy. Renamed ROKS Iksan in 1999. She was decommissioned and donated to the Colombian Navy under the name ARC Almirante Tono (CM-56) in 2016.

Development and design 

The Pohang class is a series of corvettes built by different Korean shipbuilding companies. The class consists of 24 ships and some after decommissioning were sold or given to other countries. There are five different types of designs in the class from Flight II to Flight VI.

Construction and career 
Iri was launched on 24 March 1987 by Hyundai Heavy Industries in Ulsan. The vessel was commissioned in September 1988. She was renamed Iksan in February 1999 and decommissioned on 31 December 2018. While in reserve at Jinhae on 28 September 2020, she was donated to Colombian Navy.

On 24 November 2020, she arrived in Cartagena with a new name ARC Almirante Tono (CM-56).

She was commissioned and christened on 6 January 2021. On 15 January, she began her first task on patrol to San Andrés, Providencia and Santa Catalina.

Gallery

References

Ships built by Hyundai Heavy Industries Group
Pohang-class corvettes
1987 ships
Ships of the Colombian Navy